The 2004 AIG Japan Open Tennis Championships was a combined men's and women's tennis tournament played on outdoor hard courts at the Ariake Coliseum in Tokyo in Japan. The men's tournament was part of the International Series Gold of the 2004 ATP Tour and the women's tournament was part of the Tier III category of the 2004 WTA Tour. It was the 31st edition of the event and was held from 4 October through 10 October 2004. Jiří Novák and Maria Sharapova won the singles titles.

Finals

Men's singles
 Jiří Novák defeated  Taylor Dent 5–7, 6–1, 6–3
 It was Novák's 1st singles title of the year and the 6th of his career.

Women's singles
 Maria Sharapova defeated  Mashona Washington 6–0, 6–1
 It was Sharapova's 4th singles title of the year and the 6th of her career.

Men's doubles
 Jared Palmer /  Pavel Vízner defeated  Jiří Novák /  Petr Pála 5–1 ret.
 It was Palmer's 3rd doubles title of the year and the 28th and last of his career. It was Vízner's 3rd doubles title of the year and the 8th of his career.

Women's doubles
 Shinobu Asagoe /  Katarina Srebotnik defeated  Jennifer Hopkins /  Mashona Washington 6–1, 6–4
 It was Asagoe's 3rd doubles title of the year and the 5th of her career. It was Srebotnik's 1st doubles title of the year and the 7th of her career.

References

External links
 Official website
 ATP tournament profile

 
AIG Japan Open Tennis Championships
AIG Japan Open Tennis Championships
AIG Japan Open Tennis Championships
Japan Open Tennis Championships
Japan Open (tennis)